"Believe in Me" is a song by Canadian rock group Sloan, released as the first single from the band's ninth studio album, Parallel Play. The song was successful in Canada, peaking at #6 on Billboard's Canada Rock chart.

The song has been used in CBC shows and commercials and was featured in an opening montage of an episode of Hockey Night in Canada.

References

2008 singles
Sloan (band) songs
Songs written by Patrick Pentland
2008 songs